Best College of Polomolok, Inc. is a school located in Polomolok, South Cotabato, Philippines.  It offers K To 12 and tertiary education.

External links 

 

Universities and colleges in South Cotabato